Malacocoris is a genus of true bugs belonging to the family Miridae.

The species of this genus are found in Europe and Northern America.

Species:
 Malacocoris chlorizans (Panzer, 1794) 
 Malacocoris elongatus Carvalho, 1982

References

Miridae